is a Japanese baseball player. Born in Ōita, he won a bronze medal at the 1992 Summer Olympics.

References
 

1966 births
Baseball players at the 1992 Summer Olympics
Olympic baseball players of Japan
Baseball people from Ōita Prefecture
Living people
Olympic medalists in baseball
Baseball players at the 1990 Asian Games
Medalists at the 1992 Summer Olympics
Olympic bronze medalists for Japan
Asian Games competitors for Japan